Song Young-moo (born 24 February 1949) is a former South Korean Minister of Defense.  

He is a former Republic of Korea Navy admiral who served as the Chief of Naval Operations. Song was previously serving as the Chair Professor of the Military and Police College at Konyang University before President Moon Jae's presidential campaign started in 2017 where he worked as the top security adviser on defense issues.

References 

|-

Chiefs of Naval Operations (South Korea)
National Defense ministers of South Korea
People from Nonsan
1949 births
Living people
Eunjin Song clan
South Korean Roman Catholics
Korea Naval Academy alumni